The Dead Matter: Cemetery Gates is the tenth album of the band Midnight Syndicate, released in 2008. The album consists of original music in band's orchestral, gothic, horror soundtrack-style inspired by the themes in the horror film, The Dead Matter.

Background and release 
In an interview with Fearnet, composer, Edward Douglas, said this about The Dead Matter: Cemetery Gates:  Gavin and I wanted to do a new Midnight Syndicate CD for 2008. It had been three years since The 13th Hour and we were anxious to get back to doing an all-original Syndicate release that wasn’t a movie soundtrack. When we were tossing around ideas for the theme for the new disc we thought, “why not The Dead Matter (2010) movie?" Here we had a movie about vampires, zombies, mysticism, and an Egyptian occult relic... perfect material for a Midnight Syndicate disc.   We liked it because, although it gave us familiar ground to work from, it also allowed us to explore new territory and bring back a splash of some fantasy elements reminiscent of our Dungeons & Dragons soundtrack. The bonus track Lost was actually written for the movie and will appear in it.

The album was released and self-distributed into counter-culture music chains like Hot Topic and Halloween retailers like Spirit Halloween, through Entity Productions, one of the largest distributors of Halloween music CDs at the time. A music video for the song Dark Legacy was released in March 2010, debuting at the TransWorld Halloween & Attractions Show. The video, filmed in Cleveland's Phantasy Theater, was directed by David Greathouse whose work included music videos for the band, Mushroomhead. The video marked the first time Midnight Syndicate performed live together on stage and featured cameos Mushroomhead band members Jeff Hatrix and "Schmotz".

Reception 
The album was named runner-up for Best Horror CD in the 2008 Rondo Awards. Craig Harvey of Movement Magazine compared the minimalistic piano lines on certain tracks to early John Carpenter scores. Tomb Dragomir of Rue Morgue Magazine described it as an "eerie offering of dark soundscapes" adding that "if Midnight Syndicate weren't around at this time of year, I think we would actually have to cancel Halloween."

Track listing

Personnel 
Edward Douglas – composer
Gavin Goszka – composer

Production 
Producers – Edward Douglas, Gavin Goszka
Mastering – Gavin Goszka
Album Cover Design – Brainstorm Studios
Album Photography - Darell Day

References

External links 
 Album Info on Midnight Syndicate Band website
 The Dead Matter Cemetery Gates Album on Discogs

2008 albums
Midnight Syndicate albums